North Weyburn is a hamlet in the Canadian province of Saskatchewan.

Demographics 

See also 
 Weyburn Airport
 RCAF Station Weyburn

References

Designated places in Saskatchewan
Organized hamlets in Saskatchewan
Weyburn No. 67, Saskatchewan
Division No. 2, Saskatchewan